Ribosomal protein S6 kinase alpha-1 is an enzyme that in humans is encoded by the RPS6KA1 gene.

Function 

This gene encodes a member of the RSK (ribosomal S6 kinase) family of serine/threonine kinases. This kinase contains 2 nonidentical kinase catalytic domains and phosphorylates various substrates, including members of the mitogen-activated kinase (MAPK) signalling pathway. The activity of this protein has been implicated in controlling cell growth and differentiation. Alternate transcriptional splice variants, encoding different isoforms, have been characterized.

Interactions 

RPS6KA1 has been shown to interact with:

 IκBα, 
 MAPK1, 
 TOB1 
 TSC2, and
 YWHAB.

See also 
 Ribosomal s6 kinase

References

Further reading 

 
 
 
 
 
 
 
 
 
 
 
 
 
 
 
 
 
 
 

EC 2.7.11